Mali Alexander Richards (born 2 September 1983, Taunton, Somerset) is a West Indian cricketer who played first-class cricket for the Leeward Islands.

Personal life
The son of Viv Richards, Richards was born in England and educated at Cheltenham College in Gloucestershire.

Career
Richards has had a stint with Middlesex County Cricket Club and also played for Oxford UCCE and the Gloucestershire 2nd XI. Richards has also represented Antigua and Barbuda, hitting 319 for them in a game against the US Virgin Islands in 2003. The game however was not a first-class fixture and in 11 matches for various sides he is yet to pass 50. In June 2007 he accused Middlesex of failing to help him develop. Through his father, he is the half-brother of fashion designer Masaba Gupta.

References

External links
 Cricinfo Profile

1983 births
Living people
English cricketers
Antigua and Barbuda cricketers
Marylebone Cricket Club cricketers
Oxford MCCU cricketers
Leeward Islands cricketers
Sportspeople from Taunton
Cricketers from Somerset
British Universities cricketers
Gloucestershire Cricket Board cricketers